A set list, or setlist, is typically a handwritten or printed document created as an ordered list of songs, jokes, stories and other elements an artist intends to present during a specific performance.

A setlist can be made of nearly any material that can be written or printed on, but are most commonly paper, cardboard or cardstock. They are also often laminated, especially for outdoor venues. The setlist is usually taped onto the stage where the musicians can see it, or to equipment such as a monitor or amplifier.

Artists and bands use setlists for a variety of reasons beyond the mere order of performance events. They are often used to help create the set's overall mood by establishing a memorable sense of range and variety in tone, tempo and dynamics between songs.

They are also used to create sets for specific audiences and locations. An increasingly common application is the use of technologies such as instant polling on social media and websites, where fans can choose material to be performed.

Many performers also craft their playlists to highlight other elements of their shows, such as visual ambiance, choreography, or to refer to specific albums or phases of their careers.

Music fans also refer to the setlist in the non-physical sense of what a performing artist chooses to play. Many artists use the same list for every performance on a concert tour. Others prefer to vary their lists during a tours, either for the benefit of fans who attend multiple performances or to avoid a sense of monotony among the musicians. The Grateful Dead was known for never playing the same setlist twice. Some such artists have predetermined "slots" in an otherwise mostly fixed show where different songs can be inserted. Some artists even state that the same song will not be played at two shows in a row; and still others, such as Van Morrison, use no predetermined list at all.

There are websites that track and report information on such things as the venue and bands on the bill of each date, as well as which band members were in attendance, copies of the show posters and other memorabilia available, and most importantly, the actual setlist used for that particular event. This is done to provide a more accurate record of each individual show, which is later used to differentiate between performances during a tour, as many artists will change their setlist from one night to another. In the pre-smartphone era, devoted followers attending concerts of popular artists such as Bruce Springsteen or Led Zeppelin, which have very large fan bases spanning the globe, often took on the task of tracking which songs were played and in what order, creating their own handwritten version of the correct setlist for the event to be shared later with other fans through fan clubs and other forums. When early cellular phones became commonplace with the general public, people began using text-messaging to report the songs played in real-time to a friend or fellow fan who would then update a running setlist on one or more Internet forums devoted to the performer of the night. When internet-connected smartphones came about, fans began to post the setlists directly to these forums and websites themselves, often as part of a running play-by-play commentary of their concert experiences on social media sites such as Myspace and later Twitter.

Collecting setlists has become nearly as popular for music fans as collecting ticket stubs and show posters, with the actual physical setlist becoming a treasured and uniquely rare souvenir for concert goers and fans of music, in general. Fans often wait around after a concert just so they can grab one off the stage after a performance or so they can try requesting one from a roadie or other event staff. Crew members also sometimes keep items like original setlists,  guitar picks, drumsticks and other items used during a performance as keepsakes or to later sell in the memorabilia market or on auction websites such as eBay, where collectors, fans, and concert attendees who are looking to highlight their own experience of a particular show can purchase them for their own collection. In some cases, so great is the urge for a fan to obtain a setlist that they do not wait for a show to end before trying to get their hands on one.

References

External links

 setlist.fm – the setlists wiki
 setlist.com – Online archive for setlists
 setlisting.com – Setlists and Statistics for all Artists
 setlisthelper.com – Helping musicians build and arrange setlists
 setlist.mx – Japanese setlists Archive
 setlistart.com – Artwork based on setlists
 setlists.net – Searchable online archive for Grateful Dead setlists
 livetracklist.com – EDM setlists Archive

Concerts
Memorabilia
Musical terminology